KMOM (105.5 FM, "105.5 Maverick FM") is a radio station broadcasting a country music format. Licensed to Roscoe, South Dakota, United States, the station serves the Aberdeen area. The station is currently owned by Dakota Broadcasting. It airs a mix of new country, classic country and Texas/Red Dirt country.

The call sign was previously used for an AM radio station at 1070 AM licensed to Monticello, Minnesota, United States, which operated during the 1980s and early 1990s.

On May 23, 2020, KMOM rebranded as "105.5 Maverick FM".

Previous logo

References

External links
Dakota Broadcasting

MOM
Country radio stations in the United States